Terror Trail is a 1933 American Western film directed by Armand Schaefer, written by Jack Cunningham, and starring Tom Mix, Naomi Judge, Arthur Rankin, John St. Polis, Frank Brownlee and Raymond Hatton. It was released on February 2, 1933, by Universal Pictures.

Plot
When the law is unable to stop Cattle rustlers due to corruption in town, Tom Mix with the help of cowboy  Lucky Dawson must take on the ruthless gang.

Cast 
Tom Mix as Tom Munroe
Naomi Judge as Norma Laird
Arthur Rankin as Bernie Laird
John St. Polis as Colonel Charles Ormsby
Frank Brownlee as Sheriff Judell
Raymond Hatton as Lucky Dawson
Francis McDonald as Tad McPherson
Bob Kortman as Tim McPherson 
Lafe McKee as Shay

References

External links 
 

1933 films
American Western (genre) films
1933 Western (genre) films
Universal Pictures films
Films directed by Armand Schaefer
American black-and-white films
1930s English-language films
1930s American films